Charles Wesley Jones (born Benjamin Wesley Rippay on April 30, 1852 – June 6, 1911) was an American left fielder in the National Association and Major League Baseball who hit 56 home runs and batted .298 during his twelve-year career.  He was born in Alamance County, North Carolina.  Charley Wesley “Baby”, “Big Charlie”, “Knight of the Limitless Linen” Jones, who was traded by the Cincinnati Red Stockings to the New York Metropolitans for the 1887 season, following a contract dispute.  He spent 12 years in the majors, and was perhaps the first "slugger."

Career
Jones played for several teams; the Keokuk Westerns, Hartford Dark Blues, Cincinnati Reds (NL), Chicago White Stockings, Boston Red Caps, Cincinnati Red Stockings (AA), New York Metropolitans, and Kansas City Cowboys. A popular but controversial player, despite his hitting ability he never played for a league champion.

On June 10, 1880, Jones became the first big leaguer to hit two homers in the same inning. Both home runs came off Buffalo Bisons' pitcher Tom Poorman in the eighth inning of a 19–3 rout.

Jones best period was from 1883 to 1885, when he hit 22 home runs, had 186 RBI, and batted .310. Through the first nine seasons of the major leagues' existence, Jones held the career record for home runs, despite missing two of those seasons (1881–82) as a result of being blackballed from the sport. In 1887, he dropped to fourth place. By 1889, he was just tenth, and by 1890 he was no longer among the top ten.

After his playing career concluded, Jones spent two seasons as an umpire. He umpired 121 games in the Players' League in 1890, and 76 games in the American Association in 1891.

See also
 List of Major League Baseball career triples leaders
 List of Major League Baseball annual runs batted in leaders
 List of Major League Baseball annual home run leaders
 List of Major League Baseball home run records
 List of Major League Baseball annual runs scored leaders

References

External links
, or Retrosheet
Mop Up Duty Charley Jones Bio
North Carolina Sports Hall of Fame

1852 births
1911 deaths
Baseball players from North Carolina
Major League Baseball left fielders
19th-century baseball players
National League home run champions
National League RBI champions
Keokuk Westerns players
Hartford Dark Blues players
Cincinnati Reds (1876–1879) players
Chicago White Stockings players
Boston Red Caps players
Cincinnati Red Stockings (AA) players
New York Metropolitans players
Kansas City Cowboys players
People from Alamance County, North Carolina